"Devil in a Midnight Mass" is the first single released from Billy Talent's second album, Billy Talent II.

Song information
There are two differing versions of the song: the album version, and an unpolished demo version released in December 2005 via their Myspace account. In the album version Ben Kowalewicz shouts "Yeah!" at the beginning of the track; in the other, this is omitted, and the pre-chorus and second verse sound significantly different. Both versions of the song were released on the "Devil in a Midnight Mass" single.

MuchMusic aired a "Behind the Scenes" look at the video for this song, hosted by Sarah Taylor, and filmed in an Ontario church, featuring the members of the band as well as children who took part in the recording of the video. In the feature, drummer Aaron Solowoniuk mentions that an elderly woman walked by and said to him, "A rock band in a church, don't see that everyday".

Kowalewicz told Sarah Taylor that the song was created when guitarist Ian D'sa started playing something that he described as an "evil guitar riff", and Kowalewicz wondered what sort of evil could fit with that riff, questioning what the worst thing a human being could do to another. He read an article about John Geoghan, an American Catholic priest accused of molesting about 150 children, and decided to make the song about that certain topic.

Meaning of the song
Kowalewicz told MuchMusic's Sarah Taylor,

Music video
The music video opens with Billy Talent playing in a darkened church. The video also follows the path of an altar boy. The boy is asleep in his room when a dark fog enters his room. The fog represents the priest and enters the room when the line "Footsteps down the hallway floor/Getting closer to my door" are sung. The boy runs from the fog and into the church's basement, where he finds an apparently insane man bound in ropes. The boy runs from the room and is followed by the fog. He then grabs an axe trying to defend himself. The boy runs to the main room of the church where Billy Talent are playing. Instead of the band, mouthless altar boys are standing in the room, the young boy also mouthless. The boys are the priest's victims and are mouthless to represent the fact that they have been silenced by the priest, hence the line "Silent night for the rest of my life", and in the demo, "I was told that the world wouldn't believe me".

The music video was directed by Sean Michael Turrell and was released via myspace.com on May 1, 2006.  The video premiered on Fuse on the show Oven Fresh, which highlights new videos.  The music video is #74 on MuchMusic's 100 Best Videos.  The music video is #47 on MuchMusic's 50 Most Controversial Videos.Devil in a Midnight Mass peaked 4 on the Canadian Singles Chart.

Trivia
On 102.1 The Edge's 200 greatest songs of the millennium "Devil In a Midnight Mass" came in at number 98.

On 102.1 The Edge's top 102 Canadian new rock songs (March 10, 2007) "Devil In a Midnight Mass" came in at number 52.

Chart performance

References

Billy Talent songs
2006 singles
Songs critical of religion
Songs about child abuse
Songs written by Ian D'Sa
Songs written by Benjamin Kowalewicz
Songs written by Jonathan Gallant
Protest songs
Songs written by Aaron Solowoniuk
Song recordings produced by Gavin Brown (musician)
2006 songs
Atlantic Records singles
Warner Music Group singles